Lasionycta lagganata is a moth of the family Noctuidae first described by William Barnes and Foster Hendrickson Benjamin in 1924. It is only known from three localities in south-western Canada: Banff and Waterton national parks in Alberta and the Purcell Mountains in south-eastern British Columbia.

It is diurnal and flies on fine shale scree slopes with sparse vegetation.

Adults are on wing from mid-July to mid-August.

External links
A Revision of Lasionycta Aurivillius (Lepidoptera, Noctuidae) for North America and notes on Eurasian species, with descriptions of 17 new species, 6 new subspecies, a new genus, and two new species of Tricholita Grote

Lasionycta
Moths of North America
Moths described in 1924